Tom Middleton (born 2 September 1976) is a British rower. He competed in the men's lightweight double sculls event at the 2000 Summer Olympics.

References

External links
 

1976 births
Living people
British male rowers
Olympic rowers of Great Britain
Rowers at the 2000 Summer Olympics
Sportspeople from Oxford